Eckards is an unincorporated community in Clayton County, Iowa, United States. Eckards lies on the Mississippi River, and on Iowa's border with Wisconsin.  The county seat of Elkader is located approximately 15 miles to the west.

References

Unincorporated communities in Clayton County, Iowa
Unincorporated communities in Iowa